Margelana is a genus of moths of the family Noctuidae.

Species
 Margelana brunnea Fibiger, Zahiri & Kononenko, 2007
 Margelana flavidior F. Wagner, 1931
 Margelana flavidior flavidior F. Wagner, 1931
 Margelana flavidior ochrea Brandt, 1941
 Margelana versicolor Staudinger, 1888

References
 Fibiger, M., Zahiri, R. & Kononenko, V.S. (2007). Zootaxa 1503: 13-19.
 Natural History Museum Lepidoptera genus database

Hadeninae